Little Chicago is an unincorporated community in Webster Township, Rice County, Minnesota, United States.

The community is located between Lonsdale and Northfield on State Highway 19 (MN 19).  Interstate 35 is nearby.

Knowles Creek flows through the community.  The community is located at the junction of Lonsdale Boulevard (MN 19) and Canby Trail.

References

Unincorporated communities in Minnesota
Unincorporated communities in Rice County, Minnesota